Sratsimir (1324–31) was a Bulgarian magnate with the title of Despot, holding the territory of Kran. It is unclear when he received the governorship of Kran; he held it before and during the reign of his son, Ivan Alexander (r. 1331–71). He married Keratsa Petritsa, a member of the Shishman dynasty, with whom he had five children. He was the eponymous founder of the Sratsimir dynasty.

Issue
Ivan Alexander, Despot of Lovech, who ascended on the throne as emperor of Bulgaria after a coup d'état in 1331.
Helena, married Serbian King Stefan Dušan in 1332.
John Komnenos Asen, who was made Despot of Valona by his brother-in-law Stefan Dušan of Serbia.
Michael, Despot of Vidin
Theodora

References

Sources

14th-century Bulgarian people
Medieval Bulgarian nobility
Sratsimir dynasty
Despots of the Second Bulgarian Empire